Rowbotham Lake is a lake located on Vancouver Island, Canada, north of Englishman River and east of Mount Arrowsmith.

References

Alberni Valley
Lakes of Vancouver Island
Cameron Land District